Payne, more commonly known as Payne City, was a city in Bibb County, Georgia, United States. Payne was an enclave completely surrounded by the city of Macon, and was the only other incorporated area in the county. The population was 218 at the 2010 census.

The community was named after William Sims Payne, proprietor of a local mill. Though the mill is closed today, its former site houses several small businesses. Payne was located near Macon's Vineville neighborhood and business district, and the city was closely associated with Freedom Park, an adjacent county recreation area. Payne was part of the Macon Metropolitan Statistical Area.

The city was originally expected to be dissolved when Macon and Bibb County completed their consolidation on January 1, 2014. However, the dissolution was put on hold by the state legislature in early 2013, due to the 9–7 vote against consolidation within Payne itself. On March 27, 2015, a law passed by the Georgia General Assembly was signed by the governor that abolished the city.

Geography
Payne was located at  (32.851888, -83.679192).

Demographics

As of the census of 2000, there were 178 people, 84 households, and 39 families residing in the city. The racial makeup of the city was 67.3% African American, 28.3% White, 0.56% from other races, and 0.56% from two or more races.

There were 84 households, out of which 23.8% had children under the age of 18 living with them, 20.2% were married couples living together, 22.6% had a female householder with no husband present, and 52.4% were non-families. 47.6% of all households were made up of individuals, and 21.4% had someone living alone who was 65 years of age or older.  The average household size was 2.12 and the average family size was 3.10.

In the city, the population was spread out, with 27.0% under the age of 18, 7.9% from 18 to 24, 32.6% from 25 to 44, 14.6% from 45 to 64, and 18.0% who were 65 years of age or older.  The median age was 35 years. For every 100 females, there were 83.5 males.  For every 100 females age 18 and over, there were 80.6 males.

The median income for a household in the city was $20,313, and the median income for a family was $28,333. Males had a median income of $25,000 versus $19,375 for females. The per capita income for the city was $15,109.  About 8.8% of families and 12.7% of the population were below the poverty line, including 14.0% of those under the age of eighteen and 15.4% of those 65 or over.

References

Macon metropolitan area, Georgia
Company towns in Georgia (U.S. state)
Populated places established in 1899
Populated places disestablished in 2015
Former municipalities in Georgia (U.S. state)